Anthony Errington, D.D. (died 1719?), was an English Catholic divine.

Errington was a member of a Northumbrian family. His name appears on a list of writers at the English College, Douai, but he was more probably educated at Lisbon and Paris. He is said to have died about 1719.

He wrote:
 ‘Catechistical Discourses,’ Paris, 1654, 16mo, dedicated to the ‘Princesse Henrietta Maria, daughter of England.’
 ‘Missionarium: sive opusculum practicum, pro fide propaganda et conservanda,’ Rome, 1672, 12mo.

References

Year of birth missing
1719 deaths
English Roman Catholics
18th-century Roman Catholics
18th-century English writers
18th-century English male writers